Vranov is a municipality and village in Brno-Country District in the South Moravian Region of the Czech Republic. It has about 800 inhabitants.

Geography
It lies in the Drahany Highlands. The territory is rich in small brooks. The Svitava River forms the eastern municipal border.

History
A church consecrated to the Mother of God was built here in 1240. The first written mention of Vranov is from 1365.

In 1622–1633, a Minims monastery with the pilgrimage Church of the Nativity of the Virgin Mary were founded here by Count Maximilian of Liechtenstein.

Sights

The Church of the Nativity of the Virgin Mary was one of the first early Baroque structures in Moravia. In the crypt of the church is the family tomb of the House of Liechtenstein. Extensive alterations to the temple and extensions of the family crypt were made in 1740–1821.

Today the monastery houses the Spiritual Centre, which offers accommodation services and organizes spiritual, cultural and educational events.

References

External links

Villages in Brno-Country District